The Ashe Baronetcy, of Twickenham in the County of Middlesex, was a title in the Baronetage of England. It was created on 19 September 1660 for Joseph Ashe, subsequently member of parliament for Downton. The second baronet also represented Downton in Parliament. The title became extinct on his death in 1733.

Ashe baronets, of Twickenham (1660)
Sir Joseph Ashe, 1st Baronet (1617–1686)
Sir James Ashe, 2nd Baronet (1674–1733)

References

Extinct baronetcies in the Baronetage of England
History of the London Borough of Richmond upon Thames
1660 establishments in England